Myanmar competed at the 2020 Summer Olympics in Tokyo. Originally scheduled to take place from 24 July to 9 August 2020, the Games were postponed to 23 July to 8 August 2021, due to the COVID-19 pandemic. This was the nation's seventeenth appearance at the Olympics, although it had previous competed in most editions under the name Burma. Myanmar did not attend the 1976 Summer Olympics in Montreal for political reasons.

Competitors
The following is the list of number of competitors in the Games.

Badminton

Myanmar entered one badminton player into the Olympic tournament. Thet Htar Thuzar was selected to compete in the women's singles at the Games based on the BWF World Race to Tokyo Rankings, marking the country's debut in the sport.

Shooting

Myanmar received an invitation from the Tripartite Commission to send a men's air pistol shooter to the Olympics, based on his minimum qualifying score (MQS) attained on or before June 5, 2021.

See also
Myanmar at the 2020 Summer Paralympics

References

Nations at the 2020 Summer Olympics
2020